Pandit Kanshi Ram (13 October 1883 – 27 March 1915) was an Indian revolutionary who, along with Har Dayal and Sohan Singh Bhakna, was one of the three key members in founding the Ghadar Party. He served as the treasurer of the party from its foundation in 1913 to 1914. In 1914, Ram returned to India as a part of the Ghadar Mutiny, which attempted to trigger mutinies in the British Indian Army during World War I. He was arrested in the aftermath of the failed February plot and later tried in the Lahore conspiracy trial. Ram was charged, along with Kartar Singh Sarabha and Vishnu Ganesh Pingle, and executed on 27 March 1915.

References
Across a chasm of seventy five years, the eyes of these dead men speak to today's Indian American, rediff.com.
The Hindustan Ghadar Collection. Bancroft Library, University of California, Berkeley
Echoes of Freedom. Hindustan Ghadar Collection.
.
.
.

Hindu–German Conspiracy
Ghadar Party
Indian revolutionaries
Indian independence movement
1883 births
1915 deaths
20th-century executions by British India